John Woolfall Rimmer (15 March 1910 – 1989) was an English professional footballer who played as a winger.

References

Footballers from Bolton
English footballers
Association football wingers
Southport F.C. players
Bolton Wanderers F.C. players
Burnley F.C. players
Reading F.C. players
English Football League players
1989 deaths
1910 births